Clotilde Marie Brigitte Armand (born 28 June 1973) is a French-born Romanian politician and businesswoman. Since October 2020, she is Mayor of Bucharest's Sector 1.

Armand first ran for Mayor of Sector 1 in the 2016 Romanian local elections on behalf of Save Bucharest Union (USB), a local party she had co-founded in 2015, eventually losing narrowly after having been announced as winner by the exit polls. From July 2019 until November 2020 she was a Member of the European Parliament.

Early life and education
Clotilde Marie Brigitte Armand was born in Pointe-à-Pitre, France, where her father was undergoing alternative military service as a mathematics teacher. Her family was from Vichy, where she also attended primary and secondary school. She studied at the École Centrale Paris and then the Massachusetts Institute of Technology, where she met her future husband, Sergiu Moroianu, a Romanian mathematician. She married Moroianu in 1997 and moved to Bucharest in 1999. In the following years, she lived some years in France and Germany, before settling in Bucharest again in 2003.

Career
In 2002, Armand worked for Airbus in France and Germany, managing part of the A380 project management team. In 2005, she became IT Director of Distrigaz Sud, the Romanian branch of gas distribution giant GDF Suez, later moving to Paris as Innovation Director for GDF Suez Europe. Between September 2013 and March 2017, Armand was the head of the Romanian and Bulgarian branches of French engineering company Egis.

She acquired Romanian citizenship in 2015.

Political career

2016 local elections
Nicușor Dan, a political activist and friend of Armand's husband, founded a new party called Save Bucharest Union. Armand was chosen by the party to be their mayoral candidate for Bucharest's Sector 1 and began organizing her campaign only six weeks before the deadline. Her campaign was based on anti-corruption and against politics as usual, arguing that "the political class has been separated from the true will of the people".

She promised better management of public services, following the urban design model of Paris (replacing the car-centered model with a public transport model) and building an esplanade surrounding the lakes in the northern part of the sector.

Although exit polls and early results indicated she was the winner, the final results showed that she lost to Social Democratic Party's Dan Tudorache, who received 23,220 votes (31,07%), while Armand received only 21,504 votes (28,77%).

Nicușor Dan, the president of SBU noted some statistical discrepancies: in the precincts where the party had observers, Armand won by a slim margin, whereas in the precincts where it did not have observers, Armand lost. Also, the number of canceled votes was substantially higher in those precincts and there were discrepancies between the number of ballots given to each precinct and returned. A member of the Electoral Bureau told the press that the reason of the discrepancies was that electoral precinct presidents were "idiots" who filled in wrongly the forms.

While not accusing anyone of vote fraud, Armand asked for a recount in 18 precincts. The Sector 1 Electoral Constituency Bureau refused the recount, arguing that the "lack of diligence" of her party (for not being represented in all precincts) was not the fault of the Electoral Bureau. Around 500 supporters of Armand organized a protest in University Square, demanding a recount.

Armand had also sent an objection of unconstitutionality, arguing that the plurality voting system is flawed because in her the mayor was elected by only 10% of the constituents. The objection has been accepted and forwarded to the Constitutional Court.

She was on both the Save Bucharest Union's lists for the Bucharest and Sector 1 councilors and, after the elections, she chose to be a Sector 1 councilor.

Member of the European Parliament, 2019–2020
In the 2019 European elections, Armand was fourth on the USR-PLUS list (first woman) and she won an MP seat. Armand is one of only two women among the eight MP elected on the USR-PLUS list. She served on the Committee on Budgets.

In addition to her committee assignments, Armand was part of the MEPs Against Cancer group.

Controversy
Immediately after entering politics in 2016, Armand was accused that, in her capacity of director of Egis Romania, she personally profited from a motorway building contract gone awry between the Romanian state company CNAIR and Bechtel Corporation. Armand denies vigorously any involvement in the Bechtel affair. She responded that she started working for Egis only in September 2013, months after CNAIR's contract with Bechtel ended (in March 2013); that Egis verified the quality of the works of Bechtel, was not bound by contractual links to Bechtel, and defended the interests of its client CNAIR; that moreover she was not a stakeholder in Egis. In spite of her explanations, Armand is frequently depicted in some media venues as having "cashed 50 million dollars from Bechtel".

Political positions
Armand argues that Romania needs a change of the political class. She wrote an open letter to President Klaus Iohannis in which she asked the two main parties of Romania (the Social Democratic Party and the National Liberal Party, both of which have roots in the National Salvation Front) to apologize for their involvement in the June 1990 Mineriad and to remove former president Ion Iliescu and former Prime Minister Petre Roman from public life.

Armand says she does not believe in the left–right politics paradigm, arguing that, in Romania, the money wasted due to corruption is far higher than the differences between standard left and right policies. Nevertheless, she considers herself, within the French political context, a person that is naturally right-wing, but that Romania currently has many people who need the help of the state and that these people, who did not adapt to the changes and are no longer useful to society, should be re-integrated.

Electoral history

Mayor of Sector 1

References

External links 

 

1973 births
Living people
21st-century Romanian politicians
21st-century Romanian women politicians
Councillors in Romania
Massachusetts Institute of Technology alumni
Mayors of the sectors of Bucharest
MEPs for Romania 2019–2024
Naturalised citizens of Romania
People from Pointe-à-Pitre
Romanian businesspeople
Romanian people of French descent
Romanian Roman Catholics
Save Romania Union MEPs
Save Romania Union politicians